Promethium(III) hydroxide is an inorganic compound with a chemical formula Pm(OH)3. It is a radioactive compound.

Production
Promethium(III) hydroxide can be produced by reacting ammonia water with a solution of a promethium(III) salt, from which promethium(III) hydroxide precipitates as a purplish-pink amorphous solid. By heating with water, it can be forced to crystallize, giving hexagonal crystals isomorphous with other rare earth hydroxides:
 Pm3+ + 3OH− → Pm(OH)3↓

References

Promethium compounds
Hydroxides